Canon FL refers to a lens mount standard for 35mm single-lens reflex cameras from Canon.  It was introduced in April 1964 with the Canon FX camera, replacing the previous Canon R lens mount.  The FL mount was in turn replaced in 1971 by the Canon FD lens mount.  FL lenses can also be used on FD-mount cameras.

Many mirrorless interchangeable-lens cameras are able to use Canon FL lenses via an adapter.

FL cameras 

 Canon FX (1964)
 Canon FP (1964)
 Canon Pellix (1965)
 Canon FT QL (1966)
 Canon Pellix QL (1966)
 Canon TL (1968)

FL lenses

Zoom

Wide-angle (under 50mm)

Standard (50–60mm)

Source:

Canon released 3 'levels' of standard lenses (exc. macro). The f/1.8 lenses were small and lightweight, f/1.4 were mid-range, and the f/1.2 were professional level (top of their line).

Telephoto (above 60mm)

Notes
 The FL 19mm F3.5 (not the 19mm F3.5 R) was a true wide angle (short focus) lens. Its rear projected far into the mirror box on an SLR, and because of this, it could only be used on a camera with mirror lock-up (FP, FX, FT, F-1 (old), FTb, EF). It could not be used on either Pellix model.
 The FL P 38mm F2.8 also projected into the mirror box. It was specially designed for the Pellix and could not be used on any other camera because the moving mirror would hit the rear of the lens. This lens had a longer lens mount index (the pin on the back or the lens at the top), that only fit the deeper cutout at the top of the Pellix's lens mount, thus making it impossible to mount this lens on any other camera. 
 the FL M 100mm F4 was a special purpose bellows lens. It could only be used when mounted on a bellows, such as the Bellows FL, because it lacked a focusing ring.
 The list is complete.

See also

Canon
List of Canon products
Canon (company)
Canon EOS
Canon FD lens mount

Single lens reflex
Single-lens reflex camera
Digital single-lens reflex camera
135 film

References

External links
 Description website of Canon FL lenses
 List of all Canon FL lenses with technical specifications

 

Canon FL cameras
Canon FL lenses
Lens mounts